Breckinridge Mill, also known as Howell's Mill and Breckinridge Mill Complex, is a historic grist mill complex located near Fincastle, Botetourt County, Virginia. The mill was built about 1822, and is a -story, brick structure. The mill was converted to apartments in 1977. Associated with the mill are two contributing wood-frame, late 19th-century sheds. Also associated with the mill is the miller's or Howell house.  It was built about 1900, and is a two-story, Queen Anne style frame structure with a T-plan and gabled roof. The mill was built for James Breckinridge (1763-1833) and replaced an earlier mill erected by him in 1804.

It was listed on the National Register of Historic Places in 1980, with a boundary increase in 2002.

References

Grinding mills on the National Register of Historic Places in Virginia
Queen Anne architecture in Virginia
Industrial buildings completed in 1822
Houses completed in 1900
Buildings and structures in Botetourt County, Virginia
National Register of Historic Places in Botetourt County, Virginia
Grinding mills in Virginia
1822 establishments in Virginia